Antonis Vouzas (Greek: Αντώνης Βούζας; born 3 February 1993) is a Greek footballer who plays for Fostiras F.C. in the Football League (Greece), as forward.

Club career

He started his career from the AEL 1964 youth teams until 18 June 2010 when he signed a five-year professional contract and moved to the first squad.

External links
 

1993 births
Living people
Greek footballers
Association football forwards
Athlitiki Enosi Larissa F.C. players
Super League Greece players
Footballers from Larissa